The Red Wing FFA chapter, in Red Wing Minnesota, is a youth led organization that is part of the National FFA Organization, which was founded more than 85 years ago. Developed by the Future Farmers of America, today it is simply called "FFA" as it prepares young leaders for a successful future through agricultural learning. The Red Wing FFA has been a program at Red Wing High School for many years. Starting in 2009, the chapter has been nationally recognized as of 2012.

Mission 
The mission for the National FFA Organization: 
"The National FFA Organization is a dynamic youth leadership organization that strives to make a positive difference in the lives of students by developing their potential for premier leadership, personal growth and career success through agricultural education."

Events 
The Red Wing FFA chapter is open to grades 8-12, and is the largest organization at Red Wing High School. The chapter elects officers every year to be the leaders. Through the years, the leaders of this organization have developed annual events that are popular throughout the city of Red Wing.

Earth Day and Day of Caring and Sharing 
Earth Day and Day of Caring and Sharing is a school wide event. Every student signs up for a service project to do, they have two choices. The first option is to do a service project out in the community of Red Wing, to help clean, restore and maintain its beauty. The second option has to with a tradition that has been happening for years at Red Wing High School. The first graders in the community all come up to the high school on this day and learn about animals, the environment, and how they can help. This is done by the first graders painting bird houses, going through a tour of displays and activities put together by teachers and students, and a petting zoo. Signing up for this is the other option on Earth Day. This has been a very successful and growing event since 2009, and through the Red Wing FFA chapters help, continues to get better every year.

Agricultural Open House 
The Agricultural Open House is a large event put on by the FFA Chapter to display what the agriculture department does in Red Wing High School, and also how agriculture is used all throughout the community in Red Wing, and surrounding areas.  The students in the FFA chapter work hard to get local businesses, colleges, commodities, and many more supporters to attend on this day to show what they do and educate the students and community. This event is open to all of the city of Red Wing, and all of Red Wing High School. On the day of the event, students display their agricultural experience projects they have been working on through the year, colleges promote their school, and educate people on their agricultural departments. The students also have the Goodhue County Dairy Princesses attend the event to talk about what they do and how they benefit the community.  This event educates the city of Red Wing on the agricultural side of the community and continues to grow every year.

Plant Sale 
Every year the agricultural department at Red Wing High School has a plant sale. The students in the greenhouse classes, and the Red Wing FFA chapter work during the year to grow plants for their end of the year sale. This sale is usually held on the Agricultural Open House day, and extends through the weekend.

Chapter Meetings 
Each month the Red Wing FFA Officers have a meeting for the chapter members. This meeting is to discuss new events that are coming for Red Wing FFA, and get students involved in the program.

Fruit Sales 
The Red Wing FFA Chapter has a fruit sale fundraiser every year. The fundraiser raised $20,000 in 2011.

References

External links
 Red Wing High School
 The National FFA Organization
 Red Wing FFA Facebook 
 The Agricultural Experience Tracker

Agricultural organizations based in the United States
Red Wing, Minnesota
National FFA Organization